Cotys I (Ancient Greek: Κότυς; died 48 BC) was a Sapaean client king of the Odrysian kingdom of Thrace from c. 57 BC to c. 48 BC. He was the son of Rhoemetalces.

Cotys was an ally of the Roman general Pompey, to whom he sent a body of auxiliaries under his son Rhescuporis I in 48 BC for use in the Roman civil war against Julius Caesar.

On Cotys' death, Rhescuporis I became king under the regency of Rhoemetalces I, Cotys' younger brother.

See also 
List of rulers of Thrace and Dacia

Notes

Sources
 Smith, William, ed. Dictionary of Greek and Roman Biography and Mythology. Boston : Little, Brown, and Company, 1867, v. 3, p. 870

1st-century BC rulers in Europe
Roman client rulers
Year of birth unknown
48 BC deaths
Odrysian kings